Dong Xuesheng (born 22 May 1989) is a Chinese footballer who currently plays for Shaanxi Chang'an Athletic F.C., on loan from Wuhan Zall.

Club career
Dong Xuesheng was promoted from Shanghai Shenhua's youth academy in the 2009 league season and made his debut on 7 April 2009 in a 2-1 win against Suwon Samsung Bluewings in an AFC Champions League game as a substitute for Mao Jianqing. He made his league debut against Shenzhen Asia Travel on 17 April 2009 in a 4-1 win. For the rest of the season, he became a squad regular where he was used mainly as substitute and eventually scored his first goal on 31 October 2009 in a 2-1 league victory against Changsha Ginde.

However, after Xi Zhikang became the new manager in the 2011 league season, Dong spent most of his time in the reserves and was loaned out to Shenzhen Ruby for the rest of the season. He made his debut for Shenzhen on 10 July 2011 in a 2-1 loss against Tianjin Teda where he came on as a substitute for Liu Chao. He scored his first hat trick of his career on 21 August 2011 in a 4-2 win against Dalian Shide. He scored five goals in 16 appearances for Shenzhen, but the club finished last in the league and was relegated to the second tier. In November 2011, Dong transferred to Dalian Aerbin after they were promoted from the second tier.

In February 2014, Dong received a trial with Chinese Super League side Guangzhou R&F and was believed to be signing with the club. However, on 28 February 2014, the final day of 2014 winter transfer window, he suddenly transferred to crosstown rivals Guangzhou Evergrande. On 8 March 2014, he scored his first goal for the club on his debut in a 3-0 win against Henan Jianye. Dong scored five goals in nine matches for Guangzhou at the beginning of 2014 season. However, he suffered a serious injury in a league match against Shanghai Shenxin on 3 May 2014, ruling him out for one month. He failed to establish himself within the first team again after he returned to field in July 2014.

On 25 February 2016, Dong transferred to Chinese Super League newcomer Hebei China Fortune. On 4 March 2016, he made his debut for Hebei in a 2–1 away win against Guangzhou R&F. He scored his first goal for Hebei in a Hebei Derby against Shijiazhuang Ever Bright. Dong scored seven goals in his first nine matches for the club. However, his scoring rate fell in the rest of the season after his strike partners Gervinho and Ezequiel Lavezzi struggled with injury. Dong finally scored nine goals in 26 appearances in the 2016 league season.

International career
Dong was called up to the Chinese under-23 national team in 2011 where he was reunited with his previous manager from Shanghai Shenhua, Miroslav Blažević. He made his debut on 6 June 2011 in a 0-0 draw against
Saudi Arabia. He was then part of the squad which took part during the 2012 Summer Olympics qualification where China was knocked out by Oman in a 4-1 aggregate defeat.

Dong made his debut for the Chinese national team on 18 June 2014 in a 2-0 win against Macedonia, coming on as a substitute for Gao Lin. On 10 December 2019, Dong scored his first international goal in a 1-2 defeat to Japan in the 2019 EAFF E-1 Football Championship.

Career statistics

Club

International

 
Scores and results list China's goal tally first.

Honours

Club
Guangzhou Evergrande
 Chinese Super League: 2014, 2015

References

External links
Player profile at Shanghai Shenhua website
Player stats at sohu.com
 
 

1989 births
Living people
Association football forwards
Chinese footballers
Footballers from Dalian
Shanghai Shenhua F.C. players
Shenzhen F.C. players
Dalian Professional F.C. players
Guangzhou F.C. players
Hebei F.C. players
Wuhan F.C. players
China international footballers
Chinese Super League players